Streptoglossa decurrens is a species of flowering plant in the family Asteraceae. It grows in Queensland, Western Australia and the Northern Territory. It is an upright, aromatic perennial herb or shrub with pink-purplish or reddish purple flowers.

Description
The leaves and branches are strongly fragrant, sticky and covered with soft, weak, thin hairs to long, soft, straight hairs and thickly glandular. The stems are upright leafy, older branches maybe leafless.

Taxonomy and naming
Streptoglossa decurrens was first described by Augustin Pyramus de Candolle as Erigeron decurrens. In 1981 Clyde Robert Dunlop changed the name to Streptoglossa decurrens and the description was published in  Journal of the Adelaide Botanic Garden. The specific epithet (decurrens) refers to the leaves .

Distribution and habitat
This species is found growing on rocky soils and hillsides, creek beds and clay depressions in Queensland, Western Australia and the Northern Territory.

References

Asterales of Australia
Flora of the Northern Territory
Flora of Western Australia
Flora of Queensland
decurrens